KTEC (89.5 FM) is a radio station licensed to Klamath Falls, Oregon, United States. The station is owned by the Oregon State Board of Higher Education, and is broadcast from the campus of the Oregon Institute of Technology from the College Union. The station broadcasts 24 hours a day, with DJs from Oregon Institute of Technology and the nearby Klamath Falls community hosting shows every day.

References

External links

TEC
TEC
Klamath Falls, Oregon
Oregon Institute of Technology